John Beck is the name of:

Film
John Beck (actor) (born 1943), American actor
John Beck (producer) (1909–1993), American film producer
John Beck Hofmann (born 1969), or John Beck, American film director and screenwriter

Music
John Beck (It Bites), British musician
John Beck (songwriter), British songwriter, musician and producer
John Beck, vocalist in American band The Leaves
John H. Beck (born 1933), American percussionist and educator
John Ness Beck (1930–1987), American composer

Sports
John Beck (gridiron football) (born 1981), American football coach and former quarterback
John Beck (cricketer) (1934–2000), New Zealand batsman
John Beck (footballer) (born 1954), English footballer
John Beck (golfer) (1899–1980), English amateur golfer

Others
John Beck (reformer) (1883–1962), New Zealand public servant and child welfare reformer
John Brodhead Beck (1794–1851), New York physician who was an authority on miscarriage, abortion, infant physiology, and associated forensic issues
John C. Beck (1924–2016), American physician
John E. Beck (1869–1952), Massachusetts businessman and politician
John A. Beck (married 1941), husband of Audrey Jones Beck who gave the John A. and Audrey Jones Beck Collection to Museum of Fine Arts, Houston

See also
John Beck's Boys Academy, 19th-century boarding school in Pennsylvania
Axel John Beck (1894–1981), United States federal judge
John Becke (1879–1949), British World War I air commander